For the first time in history, a Lebanese swimming team attended the 1968 Summer Olympics held in Mexico, with one male swimmer attending the event (Yacoub Masboungi). The first female Lebanese swimmer to attend an Olympics was Ani Jane Mugrditchian, at the 1972 Summer Olympics in Munich.

The Lebanese swimming team never advanced past Heats and never won any medals.

Men's Participations at Summer Olympics

Women's Participations at Summer Olympics

See also 
 Lebanese Swimming Federation
 List of Lebanese records in swimming

References

Swimming in Lebanon